Lark is a restaurant in Seattle's First Hill neighborhood, in the U.S. state of Washington. John Sundstrom is the chef.

Description 
Lark is a New American and seafood restaurant. The menu has included yellowtail carpaccio.

History 
The restaurant relocated to East Seneca Street in late 2014.

Reception 
Condé Nast Traveler has described Lark as "The ultimate night-away-from-the-kids restaurant". In 2023, the restaurant was a semifinalist in the James Beard Foundation Award's Outstanding Hospitality category.

See also 

 List of New American restaurants
 List of seafood restaurants

References

External links
 

First Hill, Seattle
New American restaurants in Seattle
Seafood restaurants in Seattle